Gaurena margaritha is a moth in the family Drepanidae. It is found in China (Sichuan, Yunnan, Tibet).

References

Moths described in 1966
Thyatirinae